Passage West  (locally known as "Passage") is a port town in County Cork, Ireland, situated on the west bank of Cork Harbour, some 10 km south-east of Cork city. The town has many services, amenities and social outlets. Passage West was designated a conservation area in the 2003 Cork County Development Plan.

History

The buildings in the town centre are mainly late 18th and early 19th century, while the architecture of nearby Glenbrook and Monkstown is mainly from the later Victorian period. In 1690, at the time of the landing of the Duke of Marlborough with his army to lay siege to Cork, Passage was described as an insignificant fishing village.

Its development from an obscure hamlet to a town may be principally attributed to its deep safe anchorage. The advancement of Cork's commercial trade was an important benefit to Passage. Owing to the shallowness of the channel above the town, vessels of over 150 tons were unable to proceed to Cork and were compelled to discharge their cargoes here. These were either unloaded onto lighters and brought up the river to Cork or put ashore and taken to the city in carts or on horseback. The only road to Cork then was via Church Hill through the site of the present Capuchin Monastery at Rochestown and then through what is now the entrance to the farmyard at Oldcourt, and on to Douglas and Cork.

In 1836, a new quay was built where the vessels could berth and land their passengers and freight. Sir John Arnott was chiefly responsible for the building of the granaries, intended for the storing of the freight from the vessels. The freight from one ship only was received there before the channel was dredged. The town then possessed three hotels and two dozen public houses. The dredging of the channel largely ended the importance of Passage as a port.

The ferry between Passage and Carrigaloe increased trade in the town. Until the opening of the Cork to Cobh Railway, the daily traffic on this ferry included up to 300 covered-in cars (jingles) carrying passengers from Cork. During the first twenty days of August 1836, over 20,000 people crossed on the ferry. The boats were flat-bottomed ones worked by a system of cables and pulleys, and capable of taking heavy cargoes. This ferry dated back to the reign of James I or earlier. In his reign, it was leased to a Patrick Terry for a yearly rent of 35 shillings. The opening of a railway line to Cobh (then known as Queenstown) caused the demise of the Passage ferry; however, in the early 1990s a car ferry service was opened between nearby Glenbrook and Carrigaloe on Great Island.
 
In the 19th century, Passage West became a bathing resort for the citizens of Cork, and the houses at Glenbrook and Toureen were in demand during the summer. Fr. T.R. England, P.P. records in the Parish Register that Passage and Monkstown had many visitors during the summer season. According to a census taken by him in 1831, the population of Passage was 1,457, of whom 1,136 were Catholics. There were two hydropathic establishments in Glenbrook. The Victoria Baths were opened about 1808 and were prosperous for a while. It closed owing to lack of support soon after the extension of the railway to Monkstown. The other baths were situated almost directly opposite the Victoria Baths and were run in conjunction with St. Ann's Hydro, a hydropathic facility near Blarney.

The opening of Passage railway station on the Cork, Blackrock and Passage Railway in June 1850 saw an increase in visitors to the town, which was for some time the railway terminus. The railway was extended to Monkstown in August 1902 and two years later to Crosshaven. From that time Passage was no longer popular as a tourist resort, Crosshaven taking its place. The railway was closed in 1932. Passage railway station opened on 8 June 1850 and finally closed on 12 September 1932.
In November 2007, to commemorate the 75th anniversary of the closure of the railway, a historical walking and cycle trail was created. This was part-funded by the Irish Heritage Council and Cork County Council. It consists of a series plaques with historical photographs and explanatory text.

The largest of Passage's industries were the two dockyards. Hennessy's yard was situated in what is now Fr O'Flynn Park. In 1815 this yard was involved in launching the City of Cork, the first steamship built in Ireland. The other and bigger dockyard was the Royal Victoria Dockyard, which was laid down in 1832 and cost £150,000 to build and equip. It received its name from Queen Victoria on her first visit to Cork in 1849. The yard changed ownership several times, and during World War I was employing over 1,000 people. By 1925, most of the workers were paid off owing to a slump in the shipbuilding trade, and it completely closed down in 1931. The Rushbrooke Dockyard was re-opened in 1940 and gave employment to many men who previously worked in the Royal Victoria Yard.

The first steamship to cross the Atlantic to America was under the command of Lt. Richard Roberts, R.N., a native of Passage West. The paddle shaft of The Sirius can be seen today and forms part of a memorial to Captain Roberts and his achievement. It is erected near the site of the now-demolished baths on the road to Monkstown just beyond the Cross River Ferry.

In John Windele's Historical and descriptive notices of the City of Cork, published in 1839, Passage is described as consisting of two old irregular streets extending in a kind of forked direction. From 1763, two fairs were held there yearly, one on the first of May, and the other on 25 July. The fairs were held in the vicinity of Fair Hill, from, which the latter received its name. On Saturday a weekly market was held in a house on the site of the C.Y.M.S. Hall. In 1752, in the Market House, John Wesley - the founder of Methodism - addressed the people of Passage whom he described afterwards, as "as dull a congregation as I have seen. They would have been rude only they were afraid." The old courthouse was a Wesleyan Chapel and was built some time after his visit here.

According to Shaw Mason's "Survey of the South of Ireland", Irish was the language spoken in 1809 by the inhabitants of the town's cottages and similarly "humble" dwellings. Other larger houses include Toureen House (which was the former Custom's House), and Toureen Terrace (which was known as Mariner's Row, as most of the houses were occupied by seafaring captains). Dock Cottages and Terrace and Marina View were built to accommodate dockyard workers.

Passage, together with Monkstown, was first constituted a Local Authority with Town Commissioners in July 1920. A year later it became an Urban District with an Urban Council. Owing to abuses a Public Inquiry was held in 1938 and the Urban Council dissolved. The area: was then placed under a Manager, and in 1942 It was de-urbanised and put under a Manager with Town Commissioners.

Passage West was directly affected by the events of the Irish Civil War, and saw a large scale landing of Free State (pro-treaty) troops on 2 August 1922. These 1,500 men, well equipped with artillery and armour as part of a wider offensive, went on to capture Cork city from the badly armed republican troops who were holding it. Many of the local homes took in the soldiers and fed them. It is said that Captain Jeremiah Collins, who was well known in Cork circles for aiding the cause, not only welcomed them into his home, but to mark the victorious landing, he raised the flag in front of his house "Carrigmahon" which overlooked the water.

Irish political leader Charles Stewart Parnell once made a speech from a building in the centre of the town.
John Wesley, Methodist founder, also preached in the town.

Recent development

Though seeing a relatively high unemployment rate for much of the late 1980s and early 1990s, in the 20 years between the 1991 and 2011 census, the population of the Passage West area grew by 60% (from 3,606 as of the 1991 census, to 5,790 by the 2011 census). According to the 2016 census returns, approximately 50% of the private housing in the area was built in this period.

In 2006, property development company Howard Holdings acquired the former Royal Victoria Dockyard site from Haulbowline Industries, a stevedoring business owned and managed by the Hill family. In December 2007, they held a public display of plans for the redevelopment of the site. However the project was subsequently cancelled due to collapse of Ireland's property boom.

Local government

Prior to 2014 Passage West was governed by a town council. The council had nine members and covered the town of Passage West itself as well as the neighbouring village of Monkstown. The last mayor of Passage West was Councillor John Daly of Fine Gael. Following the introduction of the Local Government Reform Act 2014 all town councils in Ireland were abolished. Cork County Council assumed direct control of the former town council's functions in May 2014.

Sport

The town is home to Passage West GAA, whose grounds are located in the Maulbaun area of the town.

The local association football (soccer) club, Passage AFC, play their games at Rockenham Park on Cork Road, with other facilities at Maulbaun.

Passage West Rowing Club is one of the oldest rowing clubs in the harbour, and has won several gold and silver medals in the all-Ireland rowing finals.

Twinning
Passage West is twinned with the French town of Chasseneuil-du-Poitou. The twinning charter was signed by the mayors of the two towns at the Town Hall in Passage West in 1997. Annual exchange visits for both members of the Town Council and local residents are organised.

See also
 List of towns and villages in Ireland
 St. Peter's Community School

References

External links 

 Passagewestmonkstown.ie (archived)

Towns and villages in County Cork